Juan Cifré Navas (born 26 May 1993) is a Spanish footballer who plays as a right back.

Club career
Born in Palma, Majorca, Cifré graduated from local RCD Mallorca's youth system, and made his senior debuts while on loan at CD Llosetense in the 2012–13 campaign, in Tercera División. He returned to the Bermellones in the 2013 summer, and was assigned to the reserves also in the fourth level.

Cifré made his first team debut on 24 May 2015, starting in a 2–4 away loss against Albacete Balompié in the Segunda División. On 20 August he moved to another reserve team, Sporting de Gijón B in the Segunda División B.

References

External links

Juan Cifré at La Preferente

1993 births
Living people
Footballers from Palma de Mallorca
Spanish footballers
Association football defenders
Segunda División players
Segunda División B players
Tercera División players
RCD Mallorca B players
RCD Mallorca players
Sporting de Gijón B players
SD Formentera players